The Battle of Gol-Zarriun, also Battle of Bukhara, took place in c. 560 when the Sasanian Empire allied with the First Turkic Khaganate against the Hephthalite Empire.

Context
In 484, Peroz I, the grandfather of Khosrow I Anushirvan, was killed in the Battle of Herat (484) by the Hephthalites and allowed them to annex much of Khorasan from the Sasanians.

After a stable peace agreement with the Byzantines in the west, Khosrow I was able to focus his attention on the Eastern Hephthalites and avenge the death of his grandfather. Even with the growth of Sasanian military power under Khosrow's reforms, the Sasanians were still uneasy at the prospect of attacking the Hephthalites on their own and sought allies. Their answer came in the form of the Göktürks incursion into Central Asia. The movement of Turkic people into Central Asia quickly made them natural enemies and competitors to the Hephthalites.

The Hephthalites possessed military power, but they lacked the organization to fight on multiple fronts. According to the account of Firdausi in the Shahname, the Hephthalites were supported by troops from Balkh, Shughnan, Amol, Zamm, Khuttal, Termez and Washgird. The Sasanians and the Turks made an alliance and launched a two-pronged attack on the Hephthalites, taking advantage of their disorganization and disunity. As a result, the Turks took the territory north of the Oxus River, while the Sasanians annexed the land south of the river.

Aftermath
The Hephthalite Empire was destroyed after the battle, and broke into several minor kingdoms, such as the one ruled by the Hephthalite prince Faghanish in Chaghaniyan. Ghadfar and what was left of his men fled southward to Sasanian territory, where they took refuge. Meanwhile, the Turkic Khagan Sinjibu reached an agreement with the Hephthalite nobility, and appointed Faghanish as the new Hephthalite king. 

This was much to the dislike of Khosrow I, who considered the Turkic collaboration with the Hephthalites to pose a danger for his rule in the east, and thus marched towards the Sasanian-Turkic border in Gurgan. When he reached the place, he was met by a Turkic delegate of Sinjibu that presented him gifts. There Khosrow asserted his authority and military potency, and persuaded the Turks to make an alliance with him. The alliance contained a treaty that made it obligatory for Faghanish to be sent to the Sasanian court in Ctesiphon and gain the approval of Khosrow for his status as Hephthalite king. Faghanish and his kingdom of Chaghaniyan thus became a vassal of the Sasanian Empire, which set the Oxus as the eastern frontier of the Sasanians and Turks. However, friendly relations between the Turks and the Sasanians quickly deteriorated after that. Both the Turks and the Sasanians wanted to dominate the Silk Road and the trade between the west and the far east. In 568, a Turkish ambassador was sent to the Byzantine Empire to propose an alliance and a two-pronged attack on the Sassanian Empire, but nothing came of this.

References

Sources
 . 4-volume set.
 
 
 
 
 

 
 

Gol-Zarriun
560
Gol-Zarriun
Gol-Zarriun
Military history of the Göktürks
Bukhara
Bukhara
Bukhara
Wars of Khosrow I